Spooky Stories for a Dark and Stormy Night is a children's horror anthology compiled by Alice Low and illustrated by Gahan Wilson. It was published in 1994, and contains nineteen stories by various authors. A majority of the collection is based on retelling folktales from around the world, but some are completely original, such as "Duffy's Jacket" and "Good-bye, Miss Patterson."

Table of Contents

The book opens up with an introduction by Alice Low, followed by five chapters. If the titles of each chapter are read one after another, they form their own brief story: "On a Windy, Stormy Night... Down a Dark, Deserted Road... Stands a Strange and Creepy House... With Creaks and Howls and... Gotcha!" At the end of the book, there is an acknowledgments listing.

On a Windy, Stormy Night...

Down a Dark, Deserted Road...

Stands a Strange and Creepy House

With Creaks and Howls and...

Gotcha!

References 

1994 anthologies
1994 children's books
Horror anthologies
American children's books
Children's short story collections
Hyperion Books books